The Korean Cultural Center New York (KCCNY) (Korean: 뉴욕한국문화원), a branch of the Ministry of Culture, Sports, and Tourism of the Republic of South Korea, is a government institution supported by the Korean Consulate General. Inaugurated in December 1979, KCCNY works to establish and promote Korean culture and aesthetics in New York through diverse cultural and artistic activities including gallery exhibitions, performing arts concerts, film festivals, and educational programs. The current director is Yun Jeung Jo.

History
The Korean Culture and Information Service launched in 1971 as an arm of the Ministry of Culture, Sports, and Tourism to serve as a communication bridge to promote Korea overseas and shed light on international cultural exchanges. As of 2017, it is operating 31 cultural centers in 28 countries around the world, with the Korean Cultural Center New York being inaugurated in 1979.

Since its opening, KCCNY has focused its efforts on broadening the understanding of Koreans and supporting the relationship between South Korea and the United States through cultural activities and events. It faced many limitations early on, but is now equipped with improved facilities and strong relations with global institutions and local organizations in New York that aids in the center's expanding roles.

Slogan
The official slogan of KCCNY is “A Korea In New York,” which symbolizes the center's desire to promote Korean content to the communities in New York and surrounding area. The need for this slogan was recognized due to the overall lack of awareness of Korea and Korean culture throughout the US. With “A Korea in New York,” KCCNY aims to proactively share “Korea” in a manner that can best contribute and give back to New York and the United States as a whole.

Initiatives 
As part of an effort to spread and promote Korean culture throughout the city of New York, KCCNY organizes many programs and events under diverse categories.

Film 
KCCNY annually presents “Korean Movie Night New York,” a program consisting of free film screenings showcasing specially curated Korean films ranging from top grossing hits to recent indie releases. In addition, KCCNY is in support of the New York Asian Film Festival and hosts exciting programs, such as "Master Series," to further share Korean film to US audiences.

Performing Arts 
KCCNY engages and promotes diverse performing arts events that can introduce both traditional and modern dance, music, and Korean aesthetic styles to New York. The Performing Arts department aims to provide a stage for top performing artists ranging from time-honored court music performances to rising contemporary dance programs who can reinterpret, localize, and globalize Korean traditional music-inspired performances that exemplify the highest tier of performance.

Sports 
KCCNY proudly supports athletes of all Korean sports as well as athletes of Korean background active in the world. 2017 and 2018 are particularly exciting years as the world prepares for the 2018 Winter Olympics and Paralympics hosted by Pyeongchang, South Korea. The official games will take place from February 9 to 25, and KCCNY will be hosting various programs and campaigns in New York in support of the upcoming Olympics.

Cuisine 
KCCNY is the annual host and sponsor of top Korean food competitions such as the Global Taste of Korea Contest. In addition, KCCNY holds special workshops featuring top chefs showcasing Korean cooking techniques and cuisine that shares the depth and flavors of Korea.

Library/Education 
The library located inside the Korean Cultural Center New York location holds a rich collection of over 20,000 books and DVDs in both English and Korean. It is open to the public on weekdays from 9am to 5pm, but is also available through an easily accessible online E-library found on the center's website.

Exhibition 
Gallery exhibitions are organized by Gallery Korea, a division within KCCNY. Artists of various backgrounds and disciplines have presented their artwork in line with the mission to promote cultural exchange through art. Past exhibitions include "Haenyeo" "The Movement of HERstory: Korean Embroidery" and " HANJI".

On March 17, 2021, the exhibition “Creation Continua: Park Joon Photo Portraits of Korean Artist Diaspora in Greater New York” opened at KCCNY, as part of Asia Week New York 2021.  The exhibition displays photographs of 50 Korean immigrant artists who came to the U.S. in the late 20th century.  The portraits were taken by Korean American photographer, Park Joon, who immigrated to the US in 1984. The exhibition runs until April 30th, 2021.

Directors

Current 
Yun Jeung Jo: November 2018

Former 
Jae Hong Lee: August 18, 1979
Tae Wan Yoo: April 1, 1981
Young Mo Ahn: October 16, 1984
Shin Il Park: July 1, 1985
Chan Yong Yi: September 1, 1987
Djun Kil Kim: June 1, 1990
Young Gil Park: September 10, 1993
Hong Sok Lee: April 28, 1998
Byong Suh Lee: March 1, 1999
Yang Woo Park: August 19, 2002
Jin Yung Woo: August 8, 2005
Soo Keun Song: October 11, 2007
Woo Sung Lee: October 1, 2010
Seung Je Oh: August 26, 2015

See also 
 Korean Cultural Center

References

External links 
 Official Website

Art museums and galleries in Manhattan
Cultural centers in New York City
Korean-American culture in New York City
Midtown Manhattan
Organizations based in New York City
Park Avenue